Japanese verb conjugation is very regular, as is usual for an agglutinative language, but there are a number of exceptions. The best-known  are the common verbs する suru "do" and 来る kuru "come", sometimes categorized as the two Group 3 verbs. As these are the only verbs frequently flagged as significantly irregular, they are sometimes misunderstood to be the only irregular verbs in Japanese. However, there are about a dozen irregular verbs in Japanese, depending on how one counts. The other irregular verbs encountered at the beginning level are ある aru "be (inanimate)" and 行く iku/yuku "go", with the copula behaving similarly to an irregular verb.

There are also a few irregular adjectives, of which the most common and significant is 良い yoi "good".

suru and kuru 

The most significant irregular verbs are the verbs する suru "to do" and 来る kuru "to come", which are both very common and quite irregular. Often the conjugations behave as if they were instead the verb しる or す, or respectively きる or こる, where (other than す) these are ichidan verb (Group 2 verbs, ru verbs) conjugation (note that there are no -oru ichidan verbs, though 来る sometimes behaves as if it were one), but beyond there are further exceptions. Historically する came from earlier す, which explains some of the irregularity. The following table is ordered to emphasize the regularities.

The irregular 〜ない -nai stem of する is often overlooked; it is used in grammatical forms where the 〜ない form is used without the 〜ない – generally formal – as in 食べず tabe-zu "without eating" or 食べんがため tabe-n ga tame "for the purpose of eating". In these contexts する becomes せ, as in せず se-zu "without doing" or せんがため se-n ga tame "for the purpose of doing". Note the similarity to 〜ません as the negative form of 〜ます, of the same origin.

The potential 来れる koreru form is from the omission of ra in the られる rareru potential form, and is found in all Group 2 verbs; it is considered an error by prescriptive grammarians, but is increasingly common, particularly in spoken speech and in younger Japanese.

Basic grammar 

The copula だ and です (polite), together with the verb ある aru "be (inanimate)", which is used grammatically, and the 〜ます suffix, which functions similarly to an irregular auxiliary verb, are all irregular to varying degrees, and particularly used in polite speech. It is debatable whether they should be classified as verbs or as different parts of speech.

Formally, the copula is である de aru. This form is normal in writing, but in spoken Japanese it is almost universally contracted to だ da, or in some dialects じゃ ja or や ya. When conjugated politely, である de aru becomes であります de arimasu following the regular transformation. This form is normal in writing, except that most writing either uses plain conjugations or the honorific forms, so in fact this form is not commonly seen. In spoken Japanese, であります de arimasu is universally contracted to です desu.

(*) indicates literary forms

(**) じゃ ja is a dialectal spoken form of だ da

Polite verbs 

These 5 special polite verbs have the slight irregularity that 〜る -ru changes to 〜い -i in the -masu stem (continuative form, 連用形) and imperative stem (命令形), as opposed to the expected ×〜り *-ri and ×〜れ *-re. As these all end in -aru, these can be termed "aru special class". The most commonly encountered of these is 〜ください, used for polite requests.

Euphony 
A few short verbs have irregular euphonic form (音便形) in 〜て/〜た -te/-ta form, most significantly 行く iku/yuku "go":
 行く iku/yuku conjugates to 行って itte and 行った itta, not ×いいて *iite or いいた *iita
 問う・訪う tou "ask; visit, call on" conjugates to 問うて・訪うて toute, not *totte
 請う・乞う kou "request; beg" conjugates to 請うて・乞うて koute, not *kotte
 恋う kou "miss, yearn, pine" conjugates to 恋うて koute, not *kotte
These latter euphonic changes – -ott- → -out- (→ -ōt-) – are regular in -te/-ta form in Kansai dialect, e.g., しまった shimatta "done it; darn" → しもうた shimōta, but only occur in the above exceptions in standard Japanese.

Note that euphonic change also results in some conjugations being uniform across the language, but irregular compared with other verbs. Most significantly, the た ta and て te forms (perfective and participle/gerundive) of godan verbs all exhibit euphonic sound change, except for す su verbs.

The volitional form, as in 読もう yomō and 食べよう tabeyō, does not correspond to a verb stem ending in -o but is actually formed from the irrealis -a stem, with a euphonic change of a to o – for example yomu > yoma-u > yomou = yomō. Thus the apparent volitional "stem" is not seen in other contexts.

Single kanji suru 
While pronunciation remains unchanged when two-kanji compounds are denominalized by 〜する suru verbs, pronunciation or conjugations may be irregular in the cases where single-kanji suru verbs behave as new independent words.

For example, these single-kanji words exhibit various pronunciation changes (where two-kanji suru verbs would not):
 愛する ai-suru – no sound change
 達する tas-suru – gemination (促音) from たつ+する tatsu+suru to たっする tas-suru
 禁ずる kin-zuru – voicing (連濁 rendaku) from きん+する kin+suru to きんずる kin-zuru
 禁じる kin-jiru – -zuru verbs have an associated -jiru form, which is the more common form in modern Japanese

Additionally, the 〜る can be dropped accordingly (except for the 〜じる forms):
 愛す ai-su
 達す tas-su
 禁ず kin-zu

These する／す／ず forms may be conjugated in various ways, particularly in less common forms.
One notable example is 愛する ai-suru (often conjugated as 愛す ai-su) where the potential form is 愛せる ai-seru rather than 愛できる ai-dekiru, and the negative form is 愛さない ai-sanai rather than 愛しない ai-shinai.

Some single-kanji する verbs have irregular passive conjugations which stem from classical Japanese.

For example:
 罰する becomes 罰せられる not 罰される
 発する becomes 発せられる not 発される

Alternative roots 
For a few verbs, the root of the verb changes depending on context. Most significantly, these are:
 〜得る -uru – auxiliary verb to indicate possibility, the u changes to e in the negative and polite forms, yielding 〜得る 〜うる -uru "... possible", 〜得ない 〜えない -enai "...impossible", and 〜得ます　〜えます -emasu "... possible (polite)". This is often written in kana, and is most familiar from ありうる ariuru "be possible" and ありえない arienai "be impossible".
 行く iku, yuku "go" – some dialectal differences, but generally iku by itself and -yuki when used as a suffix, e.g., for train destinations.
There is some dialectal difference here as well, with iku as more standard, but yuku common in Western Japan (as well as song lyrics). By contrast, 言う iu, yuu "say" is only a dialectal difference, with standard iu, but Western Japanese yuu.

Regular but unusual 
Some verbs follow rules that are regular (in terms of the overall language), but relatively unusual or special. While not irregular by itself, they present many of the same difficulties.

Irrealis form of u verbs 
Verbs ending in う -u have the unusual irrealis ending -wa, as in 買わない  from 買う . This is due to these traditionally having a w, but the [w] being lost except as わ wa (and in を  following an ん n).

iru and eru verbs 

All ichidan verbs end in -iru or -eru, but not all verbs ending in -iru or -eru are ichidan verbs – instead, some are godan verbs. Thus the conjugation type of a verb ending in -iru or -eru cannot be determined naively from the dictionary form.

There are many such verbs with common examples being 知る  "know", 走る  "run", 入る  "enter", and 帰る  "return".

There are also homophone verbs that could be either godan or ichidan verbs; for example, 生きる   "live, stay alive" and 寝る  "sleep" are ichidan verbs, but 熱る  "become sultry" and 練る  "temper, refine, knead" are godan verbs.

nu verbs 
死ぬ  (to die) is the only ぬ -nu verb, and thus its conjugations are less familiar, but is otherwise regular. There used to be other ぬ -nu verbs, notably 往ぬ／去ぬ いぬ  "leave".

Compound verbs 
Japanese compound verbs are generally constructed using the  stem form of the primary verb, as in 読み始める  "begin to read". In some cases compound verbs do not follow this pattern, generally due to sound change. Such exceptions include 振る舞う  "behave, conduct; treat (to food or drink)", from 振るう  + 舞う , instead of the regular ×振るい舞う *.

Abbreviations 
There are various abbreviations in Japanese, primarily of nouns or of inflections, such as 〜ている to 〜てる or 〜ておく to 〜とく, or even 〜ているの to 〜てん, though verb roots only rarely change. One such example is in the verb いらっしゃる, which has the following abbreviated forms:
 いらっしゃって to いらして
 いらっしゃった to いらした

Miscellaneous 
The imperative form of the auxiliary verb 〜くれる  is 〜くれ , rather than the expected ×くれろ *.

Adjectives 
Japanese adjectives, specifically i-adjectives, function grammatically as verbs, though with more limited conjugation. There are a few irregularities of note. Most significantly, 良い  "good" is generally replaced by ii in the base form ( is found in formal usage), though only  is used in conjugated forms such as 良く  and 良くない .

There are more minor and subtler irregularities in certain constructions, particularly in adjectives with single-mora roots. In the -me form, adjectives can replace the -i with a 〜め -me (in kanji 〜目) to indicate "somewhat", as in 薄め  "somewhat watery, weak" from 薄い  "watery, weak". However, in some cases the -i is not dropped, notably 濃いめ  "somewhat strong (tea etc.)", from 濃い 

In the  form, verbs and adjective attach a 〜すぎる  (in kanji 〜過ぎる) to the stem to indicate "excessive" – for example 近すぎる  "too close", from 近い  "close" – but in the case of a 〜ない -na-i negative ending (and standalone ない ), there is sometimes an intrusive 〜さ -sa, yielding 〜なさすぎる (standalone なさすぎる ) instead of the expected 〜なすぎる  Typically this is optional, and generally omitted, as in 忙しな（さ）すぎる  "too restless", but for single-mora stems it is generally included, as in なさすぎる  "not too much", instead of marginal △なすぎる ?. There is considerable variation and uncertainty by native speakers, as these forms are uncommon. Further, this is confusingly similar to the intrusive 〜さ -sa when an adjective is followed by 〜そうだ -sō da "appears, seems", so 良さそうだ  "seems good" and 無さそうだ  "seems not", but 良すぎる  "too good" and 無さすぎる na-sa-sugiru "too not, too absent".

Note that 静けさ  "tranquility" is not an irregular derivation of 静か  "quiet, still" – the regular derivation 静かさ  "quietness, stillness" exists and is used – but is rather a separate word of distinct etymology – in Old Japanese the root words were 静けし shizu-ke-shi and 静かなり shizu-ka-nari, to which the 〜さ -sa was separately affixed.

History 

Some irregular verbs date at least to Old Japanese, notably する、来る、ある、死ぬ. The other ぬ verb いぬ also dates to Old Japanese, though is now no longer used, and 居る  "be (animate)" was formerly をる  and irregular, though it is now regular.
 Old Japanese#Irregular verbs
 Early Middle Japanese#Verbs

References 

 "2.1.1. What Japanese verbs are irregular?", sci.lang.japan FAQ

Irregular verbs
Japonic verbs